Statistics of the 1998–99 Saudi First Division.

References

External links 
 Saudi Arabia Football Federation
 Saudi League Statistics

Saudi First Division League seasons
Saudi Professional League
2